Thriston Lawrence (born 3 December 1996) is a South African professional golfer who currently plays on the European Tour and the Sunshine Tour. He claimed his maiden victory on the European Tour in the weather-shortened Joburg Open in 2021 and also won the 2022 Investec South African Open Championship.

Professional career
Lawrence turned professional in 2014. He played on the MENA Tour in 2015 and the Challenge Tour in 2016. He won the MENA Tour Order of Merit in 2015. He played on the Big Easy Tour in 2018, gaining his card for the 2019–20 Sunshine Tour season. He won his first Sunshine Tour event in 2019 at the Vodacom Origins of Golf at Stellenbosch.

Lawrence claimed the biggest victory of his career (at that time) at the 2021 Joburg Open. It was a co-sanctioned European Tour and Sunshine Tour event. The event was shortened to 36 holes due to inclement weather. Lawrence shot two rounds of 65 to win by four shots over Zander Lombard. In August 2022, Lawrence won the Omega European Masters, beating Matt Wallace in a playoff. He was named Sir Henry Cotton Rookie of the Year for the 2022 European Tour season. In December 2022, Lawrence won the Investec South African Open Championship, one shot ahead of Clément Sordet and climbing to a career best 64th in the Official World Golf Ranking.

Amateur wins
2013 South African Amateur Championship
2014 Lytham Trophy, South African Amateur Championship

Professional wins (7)

European Tour wins (3)

*Note: The 2021 Joburg Open was shortened to 36 holes due to weather.
1Co-sanctioned by the Sunshine Tour

European Tour playoff record (1–0)

Sunshine Tour wins (3)

*Note: The 2021 Joburg Open was shortened to 36 holes due to weather.
1Co-sanctioned by the European Tour

MENA Tour wins (1)

Big Easy Tour wins (1)

IGT Pro Tour wins (1)

Results in major championships

"T" = tied

References

External links

South African male golfers
Sunshine Tour golfers
European Tour golfers
People from Mbombela
1996 births
Living people
21st-century South African people